Shirley Kaye Randell (born 8 March 1940) is an educator, advocate, mentor and leader. She is an Officer of the Order of Australia (AO), having received the award in 2010 for her services to international relations through education, public sector, institutional reform and economic empowerment of women in Australia, the Pacific, Asia and Africa.

Boards, councils and committees
Randell is a board member of the Australian Government Women’s Alliance – Economic Security for Women, the indigo foundation, and Paper Crown Institute of Canada. She is an Ambassador of Dignity Ltd, the Australian Centre for Leadership for Women (ACLW), Women’s International Cricket League/FairBreak and The International Alliance for Women (TIAW). She is a member of the Graduate Women International Projects Committee, the Virginia Gildersleeve International Fund Development Committee, and sits on the several editorial boards including the BioMedical-Central Women’s Health Journal. As of 2021 she is president of the Independent Scholars Association of Australia Council (ISAA).

Achievements and awards
Randell was made a Member of the Order of Australia (AM) in 1988 and promoted to Officer (AO) in 2010. Randell has received the Distinguished Alumna Award, from the University of New England for "international promotion of women’s rights" and the University of Canberra, The Financial Review/Westpac Inaugural Australian100 Women of Influence  and The International Alliance of Women 100 World of Difference Awards for "contributions to economic empowerment of women in the community".

Publications
Randell has contributed to reports including: the Commonwealth report Evaluation of the Impact of Rwandan Women’s Political Leadership on Democracy and Development, and the joint ILO-UNESCO report Violence and Insecurity in Schools for Teaching Personnel: Impact on Educational Access.

References

External links 

 
 

1940 births
Living people
Officers of the Order of Australia
Australian women academics
Academic staff of the University of Canberra